Xenopepla is a genus of moths in the family Geometridae first described by Warren in 1907.

Species
Xenopepla bicuneata Prout, 1910
Xenopepla flavinigra Warren, 1907

References

Geometridae